Bleeding the False is the debut full-length album by the Swedish death metal band Aeon. It was released on 20 September 2005.

Track listing

Personnel 
Aeon
 Tommy Dahlström – vocals
 Zeb Nilsson – guitar
 Daniel Dlimi – guitar
 Nils Fjellström – drums
 Johan Hjelm – bass

Production
Dan Swanö – mixing and mastering at Unisound
 Production – Johan Hjelm and Aeon
 Recorded at Courthouse Studio in Östersund, Sweden; October 2003 - February 2004
 Engineering – Johan Hjelm assisted by Daniel Dlimi
 Mixing and mastering – Johan Hjelm; Courthouse Studio; 2004/2005
 Cover artwork, cover concept, layout, layout concept – Daniel Dlimi

References 
 [ Bleeding the False] at Allmusic

2005 debut albums
Aeon (band) albums
Unique Leader Records albums